Rahguzar is a Pakistani film directed and written by Zia Sarhadi. It was Sarhadi's debut in Lollywood, after his migration to Pakistan. Sabiha Khanam, Nayyar Sultana and Aslam Pervaiz played the lead roles in the film. Muslehuddin was the music composer while Tanvir Naqvi was the lyricist. It was released on 15 January 1960.

Cast 

 Sabiha Khanam
 Aslam Pervaiz
 Nayyar Sultana
 Laila
 Nighat Sultana
 Allauddin
 Agha Talish
 Asad Jafri
 Diljeet Mirza
 Rakhshi
 Abbu Shah
 Saqi
 Bibbo

Soundtrack 

The music was composed by Muslehuddin, all lyrics were written by Tanvir Naqvi.

Track listing 
 Dil hai be-sahara, aaja mere mahiya by Zubaida Khanum
 Dil mera aa geya, aa geya by Munir Hussain
  Tujhe pyar aaye kisi pe kab by Saleem Raza
 Lehar lehar lehraye, gaye milan ke geet by Saleem Raza and Naheed Niazi
 Tere jahan mein, hamain kya mila by Zubaida Khanum and Saleem Raza
 Sham ki bela hai, koi akela hai by Kausar Parveen
 O dil walay, muskara le, duniya kitni haseen hai by G. M. Durrani

References

External links 
 

1960s Urdu-language films
Pakistani drama films
Pakistani black-and-white films
Urdu-language Pakistani films